John O. Agwunobi is a Scottish-born Nigerian-American former public health official, pediatrician, and the current chief executive officer and former executive chairman of Herbalife Nutrition. He was formerly senior vice-president of Walmart and president of the retailer's health and wellness business from 2007 to 2014.

Agwunobi served as assistant secretary for health for the U.S. Department of Health and Human Services and was Florida's secretary of health and state health officer from 2000 to 2005.

Early life and education
Agwunobi was born in Dundee, Scotland to a Nigerian father of Igbo descent, who was a British-trained physician, and Scottish mother. As a teen, Agwunobi's family moved to Nigeria, where he attended high school and university. He received his medical training at the University of Jos, where his father was a professor of medicine. His brother, Andrew Agwunobi, is CEO of UConn Health and interim president of the University of Connecticut.

Agwunobi has a master degree in public health from Johns Hopkins University, a master of business administration from Georgetown University, and a certification as a managed care executive from the American Association of Health Plans (AAHP). He completed his pediatric residency at Howard University Hospital in Washington, DC, rotating between Children's National Medical Center and the District of Columbia General Hospital.

Public office

Prior to his service in the federal government, Agwunobi served as Florida's secretary of health under Governor Jeb Bush from 2000 to 2005. He led Florida's public health response to four major hurricanes that struck the state in 2004. In addition, Agwunobi led the Department's response to the nation's first anthrax attack, subsequently guiding the state's nationally recognized efforts to prepare for, prevent and mitigate the effects of a bioterrorism attack.

Agwunobi served as the 12th assistant secretary for health (ASH) from January 4, 2006 to September 4, 2007. The Senate confirmed him for the position on December 17, 2005. During his term as the ASH, he oversaw the Centers for Disease Control, National Institutes of Health, the Food and Drug Administration, the office of the U.S. Surgeon General and was a member of the United States Public Health Service Commissioned Corps, a uniformed service, and held the rank of four-star admiral. He also served as the U.S. representative on the World Health Organization executive board.

Agwunobi has served as vice-chair of the United States African Development Foundation. He has served as a board adviser to Shopko, a specialty retail store holding corporation and board director for Magellan Health Services.

Corporate career

Walmart
In September 2007, Agwunobi was announced as Walmart's top medical professional working to expand the retailer's growth into the healthcare and wellness business. He led a team of more than 65,000 employees at the company's pharmacies, vision centers and healthcare clinics. Agwunobi later became the senior vice-president of Walmart, where he "drove down prescription medication costs and provided ongoing savings through our pharmacy offerings" before leaving in 2014.

Herbalife Nutrition
In 2016, Agwunobi joined Herbalife Nutrition, a multi-level marketing company based in California, as its chief health and nutrition officer. He became co-president in 2018 and was announced as its next chief executive officer and executive chairman in March 2020. After assuming the role, Agwunobi stated that he would focus the company's investments on weight management and sports performance. Dr. John Agwunobi departed Herbalife Nutrition in October 2022 and former CEO Michael O. Johnson was named Chairman and interim Chief Executive Officer.

References

External links
 White House bio of Agwunobi
 

American chief executives
American people of Scottish descent
American public health doctors
American people of Nigerian descent
American politicians of Nigerian descent
Florida Republicans
George W. Bush administration personnel
Howard University alumni
Johns Hopkins Bloomberg School of Public Health alumni
Living people
McDonough School of Business alumni
Nigerian emigrants to the United States
Nigerian pediatricians
Nigerian people of Scottish descent
People associated with direct selling
People from Dundee
State cabinet secretaries of Florida
United States Public Health Service Commissioned Corps admirals
University of Jos alumni
Walmart people
Year of birth missing (living people)